This is a list of cancelled Sega Saturn video games. The Sega Saturn was a video game console by Sega. While Sega found success in its Sega Genesis in the early 1990s, the failure of the Sega CD and 32X hardware add-ons left them in need of moving on to new hardware. Concerned about the impending releases of Sony's first PlayStation console and Nintendo's N64, Sega rushed the Saturn to market in regions across late 1994 and 1995. While the platform performed moderately well with sales and third party support across 1995, particularly in Japan, momentum slowed in 1996 between the release of the Nintendo 64 and the cancellation of Sonic X-treme, the Saturn's only planned mainline Sonic game at the time. With momentum stalled, many games announced from 1996 onward, particularly from E3 1996, were eventually cancelled outright, released for PlayStation, Nintendo 64, and/or PC instead, or pushed back to launch on the Saturn's successor, the Dreamcast, which itself was rushed to market across 1998 and 1999. This list documents all known games that were confirmed for release for the Saturn at some point, but did not end up being released for it.

List of cancelled Sega Saturn games

References

Sega Saturn

Sega Saturn